Events from the year 1783 in Scotland.

Incumbents

Law officers 
 Lord Advocate – Henry Dundas; then Henry Erskine
 Solicitor General for Scotland – Alexander Murray; then Ilay Campbell jointly with Alexander Wight

Judiciary 
 Lord President of the Court of Session – Lord Arniston, the younger
 Lord Justice General – The Viscount Stormont
 Lord Justice Clerk – Lord Barskimming

Events 
 1 January – Glasgow Chamber of Commerce is founded by Patrick Colquhoun, the first in Britain.
 27 January – The Herald newspaper begins publication as the weekly Glasgow Advertiser (with news of the Peace of Paris); it will become the longest continually-published daily in Britain.
 29 March – the Society of Antiquaries of Scotland and the Royal Society of Edinburgh are chartered.
 Halbeath Railway opens from the colliery at Halbeath (in the Fife Coalfield) to the harbour at Inverkeithing.
 Elspeth Buchan proclaims herself in Irvine as possessed of heavenly powers, leading to the formation of a Society of Buchanites.

Births 
 5 April – Andrew Geddes, portrait painter and etcher (died 1844 in London)
 8 April – John Claudius Loudon, horticulturalist (died 1843 in London)
 24 April – James Lindsay, 24th Earl of Crawford (died 1869 in England)
 11 June – James Baillie Fraser, travel writer (died 1856)
 15 June – Donald Mackenzie, explorer in North America (died 1851 in the United States)
 27 June – Adam Anderson, physicist (died 1846)
 6 September – George Hogarth, newspaper editor, music critic, musicologist and father-in-law of Charles Dickens (died 1870 in London)
 22 October – James Henry Keith Stewart, Tory Member of Parliament (died 1836)
 John Finlaison, actuary (died 1860 in London)
 William Glen, poet (died 1826)
 Peter Grant (Pàdraig Grannd nan Oran), Baptist minister and songwriter in Gaelic (died 1867)
 Norman Macleod (Caraid nan Gaidheal), Church of Scotland minister and writer in Gaelic (died 1862)
 Richard Poole, physician, psychiatrist, and phrenologist (died 1871)

Deaths 
 30 March – William Hunter, anatomist (born 1718; died in London)
 2 June – Charles Spalding, confectioner and diver (born 1738; died on dive in Dublin Bay)
 27 August – John Glassford, tobacco merchant (born 1715)

The arts
 The Glasgow engraving and publishing firm J. Lumsden and Son, which becomes known for children's books, is founded.

References 

 
Years of the 18th century in Scotland
Scotland
1780s in Scotland